Neurocan core protein is a protein that in humans is encoded by the NCAN gene.

Neurocan is a member of the lectican / chondroitin sulfate proteoglycan protein families and consists of neurocan core protein and chondroitin sulfate. It is thought to be involved in the modulation of cell adhesion and migration.

Role in bipolar disorder 

Neurocan is a significant component of the extracellular matrix, and its levels are modulated by a variety of factors, but mice in which the NCAN gene has been knocked out show no easily observable defects in brain development or behavior.  However, a genome-wide association study published in 2011 identified Neurocan as a susceptibility factor for bipolar disorder.  A more comprehensive study published in 2012 confirmed that association.  The 2012 study examined correlations between NCAN alleles and various symptoms of bipolar disorder, and also examined the behavior of NCAN knockout mice.  In the human subjects, it was found that NCAN genotype was strongly associated with manic symptoms but not with depressive symptoms.  In the mice, the absence of functional Neurocan resulted in a variety of manic-like behaviors, which could be normalized by administering lithium.

References

Further reading

C-type lectins
Lecticans
Extracellular matrix proteins